Pik Sovetskoy Gvardii (meaning "Soviet Guard Peak"), is a mountain in the Anyuy Range. Administratively it is part of the Chukotka Autonomous Okrug, Russian Federation.

It was named after the Soviet Guards.

See also
List of mountains in Russia

References

Mountains of Russia
Mountains of Chukotka Autonomous Okrug